The City Chap is a musical comedy with music by Jerome Kern, lyrics by Anne Caldwell and book by James Montgomery adapted from the play The Fortune Hunter by Winchell Smith.

Production
The City Chap premiered on Broadway on October 26, 1925, at Liberty Theatre, and closed on December 26, 1925, after 72 performances. It was produced by Charles Dillingham, directed by R. H. Burnside, designed by James Reynold, choreographed by David Bennett, orchestrated by Robert Russell Bennett and conducted by Victor Baravalle. The Cast featured Richard Gallagher as Nat Duncan, Phyllis Cleveland as Betty, Ina Williams as Josie, Irene Dunne as Grace, and George Raft as George.

In 1986 the show was given a concert production featuring the entire original score.

Plot Summary
Nat Duncan, the City Chap, decides to forsake the hedonistic city lifestyle and become an upstanding citizen in a small, dull, town. He moves to Radford, NY, where he takes a job at Sam Graham's dilapidated drugstore, eventually transforming it through hard work into a successful, modern, tea-room, which features jazz and liquor. Nat intends to marry the rich Josie Lockwood, but realizes that he is really in love with Betty, Graham's daughter, and he proposes to her after all complications have been sorted out a party, thrown by his friend Grace, at Saratoga.

Musical Numbers
Act I

Scene One: Stephen Kellogg's Apartment; New York City
 Like the Nymphs of Spring - Chorus
 The Go-Getter - Steve, Grace, and Girls
 The Journey's End - Nat
 Finaletto Scene I - Ensemble
Scene Two: On a Train

Scene Three: Graham's Drugstore, Radford
 Sympathetic Someone - Betty and Nat
 The City Chap - Pete, Watty, Roland and Josie
 He is the Type - Josie, Betty and Girls
 Journey's End (Reprise) - Nat, Betty, Josie and Angie
 If You Are As Good As You Look - Nat, Josie and Angie
 Finale Act I - Company

Act II

Scene One: Graham's New Drugstore, Radford
 The Fountain of Youth - Company
 A Pill a Day - Roland and Josie
 Walking Home with Josie - Company
 No One Knows - Betty, Steve, Nat and Grace
Scene Two: Grace's Private Car

Scene Three: Ballroom of Grace's House, Saratoga
 Saratoga - Chorus
 Dances - Marjorie Moss and Georges Fontana
 Finale - Company

References

1925 musicals
Broadway musicals
Musicals by Jerome Kern